Premnitz is a town in the Havelland district, in Brandenburg, Germany. It is situated on the river Havel, 8 km south of Rathenow, 21 km northwest of Brandenburg, and is only 75 km west of central Berlin, to where it is well connected by the railway and road networks. The surrounding landscape is very rural and forested in its make up.

Overview
In order to counteract the economic impact of the decline of the synthetic fibres industry, a lot of effort is being expended so as to utilise a mix of industries, more in tune with the demand for industry that is in harmony with contemporary environmental policies. One such example is Firstwood: a factory which specialises in the thermo-treatment of soft, locally grown and harvested pine, so that it is as resilient to the elements as many of its hardwood alternatives.

It is also envisaged that because of the town's proximity to Berlin and Potsdam, for example, and the development of high quality recreational facilities, Premnitz may be considered as a good place to live and commute to work, as an alternative to living in the city.

Demography

Sons and daughters of the city 
 Hans-Peter Grohganz (1948-1981), died at the Berlin Wall
 Karsten Heinz (born 1960), handball goalkeeper and coach
 Anke Domscheit-Berg (born 1968), entrepreneur and politician

References

Localities in Havelland